Ireland–Sweden relations are foreign relations between Ireland and Sweden. Ireland has an embassy in Stockholm. Sweden has an embassy in Dublin. Both countries are full members of Council of Europe and of the European Union.

History
The Vikings from the Scandinavian countries began raiding Ireland just before 800 AD and continued for two centuries before Brian Boru defeated them at the Battle of Clontarf in 1014. The first recorded Viking raid in Ireland occurred in 795 AD when the church on Lambeg Island in Dublin was plundered and burned. The speaker of the Swedish Parliament, Per Westerberg, visited Dublin on June 26, 2009 just a few days before the start of the Swedish Presidency of the European Union. On  July 17, 2009 the Swedish Trade Council will close their office in Dublin and move the Irish operations to their UK office. There are 2,982 Irish people living in Sweden and 1,713 Swedes living in Ireland.

See also 
 Foreign relations of Ireland
 Foreign relations of Sweden

References

External links 
  Irish embassy in Stockholm
  Swedish embassy for Ireland

 
Sweden 
Bilateral relations of Sweden